The Faculty of Asian and Middle Eastern Studies (formerly the Faculty of Oriental Studies), is a subdivision of the University of Oxford.

The faculty is engaged in a broad range of research and teaching on modern and historical Asian and Middle Eastern studies, focusing on politics, language, and culture. The faculty's main building is located on Pusey Lane near the Ashmolean Museum and Sackler Library, with some research centres of the faculty having their own buildings elsewhere in Oxford (such as the Middle East Centre based at St. Antony's College, Oxford). The faculty is part of the Humanities Division at the University of Oxford. The faculty has its own library for students and professors, which is both a lending library and a reading room of the Bodleian Library.

The faculty was known as the Faculty of Oriental Studies until 1 August 2022, when the name was changed to Faculty of Asian and Middle Eastern Studies. The name was changed due to its perceived colonial implications.

Sub-faculties
The faculty is divided into three sub-faculties based on subject area, including:

 Sub-Faculty of Middle Eastern Studies, which covers
 Department of the Islamic World 
 Department of Modern Middle Eastern Studies
 Department of Hebrew and Jewish Studies (also based at the Oxford Centre for Hebrew and Jewish Studies)
 Department of Egyptology and Ancient Near Eastern Studies (also based at the Griffith Institute)
 Sub-Faculty of South and Inner Asian Studies, which covers
 Hindi and Urdu politics, language, and culture
 Sanskrit (classical and Vedic)
 Tibetan and Himalayan Cultural Studies
 Sub-Faculty of East Asian Studies (also based at the Eastern Art Department of the Ashmolean Museum), which covers
 Chinese (based at the University of Oxford China Centre, Canterbury Road)
 Japanese (also based at the Nissan Institute of Japanese Studies, Winchester Road )
 Korean, politics, and culture

Notable people
Statutory professorships: 
 Regius Professor of Hebrew – vacant
 Laudian Professor of Arabic – Julia Bray
 Professor of Egyptology – Richard B. Parkinson
 Boden Professor of Sanskrit – Christopher Minkowski
 Calouste Gulbenkian Professor of Armenian Studies – Theo Maarten van Lint
 Spalding Professor of Eastern Religion and Ethics – Diwakar Acharya
 I.M. Pei Professor of Islamic Art and Architecture – Alain Fouad George
 Stanley Ho Professor of Chinese History – Henrietta Harrison
 Soudavar Professor of Persian Studies – Edmund Herzig
 Yehan Numata Professor of Buddhist Studies – Stefano Zacchetti
 Khalid bin Abdullah Al Saud Professor for the Study of the Contemporary Arab World – Marilyn Booth
 HH Sheikh Hamad Bin Khalifa Al Thani Professor of Contemporary Islamic Studies – vacant

Other notable current academics:
 Martin Goodman
 Christopher Melchert
 Judith Olszowy-Schlanger
 Eugene Rogan

References

External links 

 Official website of the Faculty of Asian and Middle Eastern Studies
 Official website of the Nizami Ganjavi Library
 Griffith Institute, Ashmolean Museum
 Oxford Centre for Hebrew and Jewish Studies
 Khalili Research Centre for Art and the Material Culture of the Middle East
 Eastern Art Department, Ashmolean Museum
 Nissan Institute of Japanese Studies

Departments of the University of Oxford
Research institutes in Oxford
Libraries of the University of Oxford
Oriental studies